Rohit may refer to:
Rohit (name)
Rohit (caste)